Javakheti Range or Javakhk Range (also Kechut Range or Wet Mountains;) – is a volcanic range in southern Georgia and northern Armenia. The range is about 50 km (31 mi) long and runs north to south from Trialeti to Bazum Range. The highest peak is Achkasar at an elevation 3196 m (10485 ft) above sea level. Other notable peaks include Leyli (3154), Yemlikli (3054), Garanlig (3039), Aghrigar (2973) and Shambiani (2923). Javakheti Range is known with a lot of rainfall too. The name of Wet Mountains originated herein. Range are mainly covered with alpine meadows and grasslands. There are a number of small-sized lakes in and around the Javakheti Range.

See also
 Mount Yemlikli
 Mount Leyli
 Javakheti Plateau
 Abul-Samsari Range
 Lesser Caucasus

References

External links
 Джавахетский хребет

Mountain ranges of Georgia (country)
Mountain ranges of Armenia